The Samford Bulldogs women's basketball team, formerly the Samford Lady Bulldogs, is the intercollegiate women's basketball program representing Samford University in Homewood, Alabama, United States. Since 2008, the team competes in the Southern Conference (SoCon), after leaving the Ohio Valley Conference (OVC). They play their home games at the Pete Hanna Center.

Coaches
The Samford Bulldogs have had three coaches in their  history. Until the end of the 2018–19 season, the team was coached by Mike Morris, who took over in 2002 for Janet Cone after she became Samford's associate athletics director. In 2019, Carley Kuhns was hired from Valdosta State University to become the third head coach in history.

Janet Cone coaching history

Mike Morris coaching history

Carley Kuhns coaching history

Source:

NCAA tournament results
The Bulldogs have appeared in two NCAA Tournaments, with a combined record of 0–2.

References

External links
 

 
Southern Conference women's basketball